Alexander Brett Mendoza Knaus (born August 16, 1990) is an American soccer player.

Career 
Mendoza began his career with UNAM Pumas, appearing for their youth and reserve teams. He spent time with Athletic Club Morelos and had a short stint with MLS side Philadelphia Union ahead of their 2013 season.

Mendoza signed with United Soccer League side Las Vegas Lights ahead of their inaugural 2018 season.

On March 29, 2019 it was announced that Mendoza had signed with National Premier Soccer League side Grand Rapids FC for the 2019 NPSL season.

References

External links 
 

1990 births
Living people
American soccer players
Association football midfielders
Soccer players from Pennsylvania
Sportspeople from Harrisburg, Pennsylvania
Philadelphia Union players
Harrisburg Heat (MASL) players
Las Vegas Lights FC players
Major Arena Soccer League players
USL Championship players
American expatriate soccer players
American expatriate sportspeople in Mexico
Expatriate footballers in Mexico